The following is a list of events affecting American television during 2003. Events listed include television series debuts, finales, cancellations, and new channel initiations.

Events

January

February

March
{| class="wikitable"
|-
! Date
! Event
|-
!21
| Farscape'''s series finale, "Bad Timing", airs on Sci Fi.
|-
!27
| C-SPAN airs a press conference being held in the White House in which President George W. Bush and British Prime Minister Tony Blair spoke about the 2003 Invasion of Iraq which had begun roughly one week prior.  The event was one of the most-watched C-SPAN broadcasts of the year according to Nielsen ratings and was simultaneously broadcast on CNN and Fox News.  A similar broadcast in April of the following year was similarly widely viewed.
|-
!29
| K13VC ends operations.
|}

April

May

June

July

August

September

October

November

December

Programs
Debuts

Returning this year

Ending this year

Entering syndication this year

Changes of network affiliation

Made-for-TV movies

Television stations

Station launches

Network affiliation changes

Station closures 

Births

Deaths

Television Debuts
Chris O'Dowd – Red Cap''

See also 
 2003 in the United States
 List of American films of 2003

References

External links 
List of 2003 American television series at IMDb

 
2000s in American television